Raquel Atawo and Jeļena Ostapenko were the defending champions, but chose not to participate together this year. Atawo successfully defended the title alongside Anna-Lena Grönefeld, defeating Nicole Melichar and Květa Peschke in the final, 6–4, 6–7(5–7), [10–5]. Ostapenko teamed up with Olga Savchuk, but lost in the quarterfinals to Atawo and Grönefeld.

Seeds

Draw

Draw

References

External Links
 Main Draw

Porsche Tennis Grand Prixandnbsp;- Doubles
2018 Doubles